George Hutchison (1818–1894) was a Scottish minister who served as Moderator of the General Assembly of the Church of Scotland in 1887.

Life

Hutchison was born in Forres the son of George Hutchison on 24 August 1818. He was educated locally then studied Divinity at King's College, Aberdeen, graduating MA in 1840.

In March 1845 he was ordained as minister of Monzie. In November 1846 he translated to Banchory Ternan and was minister there for 48 years. In March 1870 Aberdeen University awarded him an honorary Doctor of Divinity.

In 1887 he succeeded the John Cunningham as Moderator of the General Assembly of the Church of Scotland the highest position in the Scottish Church. He was succeeded by Rev William Henry Gray.

He died during a visit to London on 20 November 1894. His position at Banchory was filled by James Hall.

Family
In February 1847 he married Jane Stewart Wright (d.1884), third daughter of George Wright of Kingsbarns. Their children included:

George Wright Hutchison (b.1848)
John Hutchsison (1850-1891) died in Singapore
Maxwell Hutchison (1853-1897), minister of Kirkmahoe in Dumfries and Galloway
Euphemia (b.1858)
Anna Moncrieff Hutchison (b.1862)

Publications
Knowledge (1863)

References
 

1818 births
1894 deaths
People from Forres
Moderators of the General Assembly of the Church of Scotland